Suad Khalil Ismail (1928-1995), was an Iraqi politician.

She served as Minister of Higher Education in 1969-1972. She was the second woman to have served in the Iraqi Cabinet.

References

20th-century Iraqi women politicians
20th-century Iraqi politicians
Government ministers of Iraq
Women government ministers of Iraq
1928 births
1995 deaths